Media is a ghost town in Douglas County, Kansas, United States.

History
The first settlement at Media was made in 1878. Media was located on the Kansas City, Lawrence & Southern Kansas Railroad. A post office was established in Media in 1878, and remained in operation until it was discontinued in 1903. Media was eventually absorbed into present-day Baldwin City.

References

Further reading

Geography of Douglas County, Kansas
Ghost towns in Kansas